The 2015 Segunda División play-offs took place in June 2015 and has  determined the third team which will be promoted to the top division. Teams placed between 3rd and 6th position (excluding reserve teams) are taking part in the promotion play-offs.

The regulations are the same as the previous season: in the semifinals the fifth placed team faces the fourth, while the sixth placed team faces the third. In case of a draw, extra time  was played but there   was a penalty shoot-out; the winner will be the best positioned team. The first leg of the semi-finals was played on 10 and 11 June, and the second leg on 13 and 14 June at home of the best positioned team. The final will also be two-legged, with the first leg on 18 June and the second leg on 21 June, with the best positioned team also playing the second leg at home.

Road to the playoffs

League table

Girona
Girona qualified for the play-offs after failing to be automatically promoted in the final game of the season. The Catalans could not beat Lugo at Estadi Montilivi while Sporting Gijón beat Betis, to gain promotion. This will be the third time Girona has played this stage.

Las Palmas
Las Palmas assured the fourth position in the 41st game of the season. The Canarian team made a spectacular start finishing as leader in the first half of the season, but failed to gain automatic promotion after suffering several defeats. This will be its third consecutive promotion play-off.

Valladolid
As with Las Palmas, Real Valladolid assured its final position, fifth, in the 41st round. This is its first season in the Segunda División since its relegation in 2014.

Zaragoza
In its second season since its relegation from La Liga, Zaragoza clinched the sixth and last playoff spot in the last matchday. This will be its first performance at this stage.

Promotion play-offs

Semifinals

|}

First leg

Second leg

Final

|}

First leg

Second leg

References

External links
Segunda División at LFP website

2014-15
play-offs
1